The Ken McKenzie Award is presented annually to an individual who accomplished the most during the season in promoting his or her American Hockey League team, by marketing and public relations. The award is named for Ken McKenzie, the co-founder and longtime president and publisher of The Hockey News.

Winners

References

External links
Official AHL website
AHL Hall of Fame

American Hockey League trophies and awards